Richard Malin Ohmann (July 11, 1931October 8, 2021) was an American literary critic.

Richard Malin Ohmann was born on July 11, 1931, in Shaker Heights, Ohio. He received a bachelor's degree in literature from Oberlin College in 1952 and a master's and doctorate from Harvard University in 1954 and 1960, respectively. 

He began teaching at Wesleyan University in 1961, where he was the associate provost from 1966 to 1969. He was a full professor of English from 1966 and was named the Benjamin Waite Professor of the English Language at some point. Ohmann held a Guggenheim Fellowship in 1964–65.

Ohmann was a Marxist. At Wesleyan, he taught a course called "Economics of Fiction". 

Ohmann died on October 8, 2021, in Hawley, Massachusetts.

Books 

 
  (one chapter by Wallace W. Douglas)

References

Further reading 
 

1931 births
2021 deaths
American literary critics
American Marxists
Harvard University alumni
Oberlin College alumni
People from Shaker Heights, Ohio
Wesleyan University faculty